Mehdi Niyayesh Pour (born 25 January 1992) is an Iranian footballer, currently playing in  Naft Masjed Soleyman. He plays as a striker, but can also play as a right winger.

Mehdi Nayeshpour is considered the best scorer in the history of the Under-21 Premier League in 2013. He scored 25 goals in 16 games in the Under-21 Premier League. Managed to move the record for 16 years and reach an unreachable record, and this record is still lasting.

References

Iranian footballers
1992 births
Living people
Esteghlal Ahvaz players
Foolad FC players
Association football forwards
People from Ahvaz
Sportspeople from Khuzestan province